John Busby Armstrong (23 September 1890 – 13 December 1950) was an English professional footballer who played as a forward.

References

1890 births
1950 deaths
Footballers from Gateshead
English footballers
Association football forwards
Shildon A.F.C. players
Grimsby Town F.C. players
English Football League players